The Somers School Camp is a Victorian Department of Education and Early Childhood Development school camp in Somers, Victoria, Australia.

History

No. 1 Initial Training School
The site was purchased in 1940 and Lord Somers Camp was requisitioned to form the site of the camp for No. 1 Initial Training School for the Royal Australian Air Force as part of the Empire Air Training Scheme during World War II. Recruits commenced their military service at the Initial Training School, learning fundamentals such as mathematics, navigation and aerodynamics.

Post War
The camp was sold in 1947 and operated as a private holiday resort. The site was reacquired to act as a migrant camp for immigrants from Europe after World War II.

The site was purchased by the Victorian Education Department and altered by the Public Works Department to the requirements of a school camp and opened in September 1959.

References
Somers Camp History

Education in Victoria (Australia)